Farmingdale is a borough in Monmouth County, in the U.S. state of New Jersey. As of the 2010 United States Census, the borough's population was 1,329, reflecting a decline of 258 (−16.3%) from the 1,587 counted in the 2000 Census, which had in turn increased by 125 (+8.5%) from the 1,462 counted in the 1990 Census.

Farmingdale was incorporated as a borough by an act of the New Jersey Legislature on April 8, 1903, from portions of Howell Township. The borough is named for its location at the center of an agricultural area.

Geography
According to the United States Census Bureau, the borough had a total area of 0.52 square miles (1.35 km2), all of which was land.

The borough is completely surrounded by Howell Township, making it part of 21 pairs of "doughnut towns" in the state, where one municipality entirely surrounds another.

Demographics

Census 2010

The Census Bureau's 2006–2010 American Community Survey showed that (in 2010 inflation-adjusted dollars) median household income was $63,191 (with a margin of error of +/− $2,838) and the median family income was $69,688 (+/− $10,093). Males had a median income of $56,518 (+/− $4,270) versus $36,625 (+/− $5,921) for females. The per capita income for the borough was $31,425 (+/− $2,251). About 2.6% of families and 4.0% of the population were below the poverty line, including 5.6% of those under age 18 and 9.6% of those age 65 or over.

Census 2000

As of the 2000 United States Census there were 1,587 people, 625 households, and 406 families residing in the borough. The population density was 2,972.2 people per square mile (1,156.1/km2). There were 638 housing units at an average density of 1,194.9 per square mile (464.8/km2). The racial makeup of the borough was 93.64% White, 1.13% African American, 2.33% Asian, 2.08% from other races, and 0.82% from two or more races. Hispanic or Latino of any race were 3.84% of the population.

There were 625 households, out of which 37.3% had children under the age of 18 living with them, 51.5% were married couples living together, 8.8% had a female householder with no husband present, and 35.0% were non-families. 29.0% of all households were made up of individuals, and 6.6% had someone living alone who was 65 years of age or older. The average household size was 2.54 and the average family size was 3.21.

In the borough the population was spread out, with 27.0% under the age of 18, 7.4% from 18 to 24, 35.5% from 25 to 44, 21.1% from 45 to 64, and 9.0% who were 65 years of age or older. The median age was 35 years. For every 100 females, there were 102.2 males. For every 100 females age 18 and over, there were 107.0 males.

The median income for a household in the borough was $48,889, and the median income for a family was $59,625. Males had a median income of $40,000 versus $27,375 for females. The per capita income for the borough was $21,667. About 5.6% of families and 5.7% of the population were below the poverty line, including 7.0% of those under age 18 and 6.3% of those age 65 or over.

Government

Local government
Farmingdale is governed under the Borough form of New Jersey municipal government, which is used in 218 municipalities (of the 564) statewide, making it the most common form of government in New Jersey. The governing body is comprised of the Mayor and the Borough Council, with all positions elected at-large on a partisan basis as part of the November general election. A Mayor is elected directly by the voters to a four-year term of office. The Borough Council is comprised of six members elected to serve three-year terms on a staggered basis, with two seats coming up for election each year in a three-year cycle. The Borough form of government used by Farmingdale is a "weak mayor / strong council" government in which council members act as the legislative body with the mayor presiding at meetings and voting only in the event of a tie. The mayor can veto ordinances subject to an override by a two-thirds majority vote of the council. The mayor makes committee and liaison assignments for council members, and most appointments are made by the mayor with the advice and consent of the council.

, the mayor of Farmingdale is Republican James A. Daly, whose term of office ends December 31, 2023; Daly had been named as acting mayor following the March 2016 death of John P. "Jay" Morgan. Members of the Borough Council are Council President Patricia A. Linszky (R, 2024), Erich Brandl (R, 2023), Kaaren L. Corallo (R, 2024), George J. Dyevoich (R, 2022), Colleen Sagan (R, 2022; elected to serve an unexpired term) and Dr. Don H. Steinfeld (R, 2023).

In July 2020, the Borough Council appointed Colleen Sagan to fill the seat expiring in December 2022 that had been held by Michael J. Romano until his death two months earlier. Sagan served on an interim basis until the November 2020 general election when she was chosen to serve the balance of the term of office.

The 2012 elections included the election of all six council seats in the wake of the resignation of all six council members during the previous year.

Federal, state and county representation
Farmingdale is located in the 4th Congressional District and is part of New Jersey's 30th state legislative district.

 

Monmouth County is governed by a Board of County Commissioners comprised of five members who are elected at-large to serve three year terms of office on a staggered basis, with either one or two seats up for election each year as part of the November general election. At an annual reorganization meeting held in the beginning of January, the board selects one of its members to serve as director and another as deputy director. , Monmouth County's Commissioners are
Commissioner Director Thomas A. Arnone (R, Neptune City, term as commissioner and as director ends December 31, 2022), 
Commissioner Deputy Director Susan M. Kiley (R, Hazlet Township, term as commissioner ends December 31, 2024; term as deputy commissioner director ends 2022),
Lillian G. Burry (R, Colts Neck Township, 2023),
Nick DiRocco (R, Wall Township, 2022), and 
Ross F. Licitra (R, Marlboro Township, 2023). 
Constitutional officers elected on a countywide basis are
County clerk Christine Giordano Hanlon (R, 2025; Ocean Township), 
Sheriff Shaun Golden (R, 2022; Howell Township) and 
Surrogate Rosemarie D. Peters (R, 2026; Middletown Township).

Politics
As of March 23, 2011, there were a total of 929 registered voters in Farmingdale, of which 166 (17.9%) were registered as Democrats, 325 (35.0%) were registered as Republicans and 436 (46.9%) were registered as Unaffiliated. There were 2 voters registered as Libertarians or Greens.

In the 2012 presidential election, Republican Mitt Romney received 51.9% of the vote (364 cast), ahead of Democrat Barack Obama with 47.1% (330 votes), and other candidates with 1.0% (7 votes), among the 709 ballots cast by the borough's 966 registered voters (8 ballots were spoiled), for a turnout of 73.4%. In the 2008 presidential election, Republican John McCain received 50.1% of the vote (360 cast), ahead of Democrat Barack Obama with 47.1% (338 votes) and other candidates with 1.5% (11 votes), among the 718 ballots cast by the borough's 967 registered voters, for a turnout of 74.3%. In the 2004 presidential election, Republican George W. Bush received 61.0% of the vote (424 ballots cast), outpolling Democrat John Kerry with 38.0% (264 votes) and other candidates with 0.7% (7 votes), among the 695 ballots cast by the borough's 934 registered voters, for a turnout percentage of 74.4.

In the 2013 gubernatorial election, Republican Chris Christie received 75.5% of the vote (379 cast), ahead of Democrat Barbara Buono with 22.1% (111 votes), and other candidates with 2.4% (12 votes), among the 514 ballots cast by the borough's 991 registered voters (12 ballots were spoiled), for a turnout of 51.9%. In the 2009 gubernatorial election, Republican Chris Christie received 66.7% of the vote (320 ballots cast), ahead of  Democrat Jon Corzine with 24.4% (117 votes), Independent Chris Daggett with 8.1% (39 votes) and other candidates with 0.6% (3 votes), among the 480 ballots cast by the borough's 939 registered voters, yielding a 51.1% turnout.

Education 
The Farmingdale School District serves public school students in pre-kindergarten through eighth grade at Farmingdale Elementary School. As of the 2020–21 school year, the district, comprised of one school, had an enrollment of 160 students and 24.2 classroom teachers (on an FTE basis), for a student–teacher ratio of 6.6:1. In the 2016–17 school year, Farmingdale had the 34th-smallest enrollment of any school district in the state, with 161 students.

Public school students in ninth through twelfth grades attend Howell High School, as part of the Freehold Regional High School District (FRHSD). The district also serves students from Colts Neck Township, Englishtown, Freehold Borough, Freehold Township, Howell Township, Manalapan Township and Marlboro. As of the 2020–21 school year, the high school had an enrollment of 2,094 students and 134.2 classroom teachers (on an FTE basis), for a student–teacher ratio of 15.6:1. Students may apply to attend one of the district's six specialized learning centers, including the Humanities Learning Center hosted at Howell High School. The FRHSD board of education has nine members, who are elected to three-year terms from each of the constituent districts. Each member is allocated a fraction of a vote that totals to nine points, with Farmingdale allocated one member, who has 0.5 votes.

Transportation

Roads and highways

County Route 547 and County Route 524 are the most prominent roads which pass directly through the borough. Route 33 and Route 34 are the closest state highways. Interstate 195 is the nearest limited-access highway.

Airport
Monmouth Executive Airport is a public-use airport located east of Farmingdale.

Notable people

People who were born in, residents of, or otherwise closely associated with Farmingdale include:
 Charles H. Boud (1843–1921), politician who served in the New Jersey General Assembly.
 George Fischbeck (1922–2015), television weatherman
 Jim Gary (1939–2006), sculptor popularly known for his large, colorful creations of dinosaurs made from discarded automobile parts
 Chris Hill (born 1994), soccer defender who currently plays for Harrisburg City Islanders in the USL
 Herman Hill (1945–1970), professional baseball outfielder who appeared in 43 games for the Minnesota Twins
 Janis Ian (born 1951), singer-songwriter and author known for her 1967 top twenty hit "Society's Child" and her 1975 top five "At Seventeen"
 Denny Walling (born 1954), Major League Baseball player in the 1980s who played predominantly for the Houston Astros

References

External links

Farmingdale Borough website

 
1903 establishments in New Jersey
Borough form of New Jersey government
Boroughs in Monmouth County, New Jersey
Populated places established in 1903